MPEG Audio Decoder (MAD) is a GPL library for decoding files that have been encoded with an MPEG audio codec.  It was written by Robert Leslie and produced by Underbit Technologies. It was developed as a new implementation, on the ISO/IEC standards.

It consists of libmad, a software library, and madplay, a command-line program for MP3 playback. libmad is notable for using only fixed-point arithmetic while madplay is notable for its ReplayGain support.

References

External links
MAD's home page
MAD's SourceForge page
Official MPEG web site

Free audio codecs